Newsmax (Newsmax Media, Inc. or Newsmax.com, previously styled NewsMax) is an American right-wing to far-right cable news and digital media company founded by Christopher Ruddy on September 16, 1998. Newsmax Media divisions include its cable and broadcast channel Newsmax TV; its popular website Newsmax.com, which includes Newsmax Health and Newsmax Finance; and Newsmax magazine, its monthly print publication.

Newsmax launched a cable TV channel on June 16, 2014 to 35 million satellite subscribers through DirecTV and Dish Network. As of May 2019, the network reaches about 75 million cable homes and has wide digital media player/mobile device availability. The channel primarily broadcasts from Newsmax's New York studio on Manhattan's East Side, with two headquarters in Boca Raton, Florida and Washington, DC.

The website has been described by The New York Times as a "potent force in conservative politics." CEO Christopher Ruddy has attempted to position the network as a competitor to Fox News, including by hiring former Fox News hosts Rob Schmitt, Greg Kelly, Bob Sellers and Heather Childers. The Washington Post described Newsmax as "a landing spot for cable news personalities in need of a new home," citing the network's airing of Mark Halperin and Bill O'Reilly following their resignations from other networks due to sexual harassment allegations.

After the 2020 United States presidential election, Newsmax published numerous conspiracy theories made by President Donald Trump and the Trump campaign about voter fraud in the 2020 election, though the network never confirmed the veracity of the statements and accepted the election of Joe Biden as duly elected President. Newsmax later issued an apology and publicly retracted any voter fraud conspiracy allegations. When asked about Newsmax's support of former President Trump, Ruddy stated, "We have an editorial policy of being supportive of the president and his policies".

In 2021, the channel was sued by Dominion Voting Systems and Smartmatic for promoting false claims that the companies had engaged in election fraud during the 2020 presidential election. DirecTV dropped Newsmax from its lineup in January 2023, after the companies failed to agree on contract terms. In response, forty-two House Republicans signed a letter to DirecTV executives attacking the removal as an act of "suppressing politically disfavored speech."

History and content 
Ruddy started Newsmax.com on September 16, 1998, supported by a group of investors, including the family of former Central Intelligence Agency Director William J. Casey. Later, Richard Mellon Scaife, Ruddy's former employer at the Pittsburgh Tribune-Review, invested in the fledgling company. One of the initial board members was author James Dale Davidson who edited a financial newsletter. Davidson's co-editor, Lord Rees-Mogg, former editor of the London Times, later became chairman of Newsmax. Ruddy previously promoted conspiracy theories around the suicide of Vince Foster.

Other news figures who later joined the Newsmax board included Arnaud de Borchgrave, the longtime Newsweek chief correspondent who also serves as editor-at-large of United Press International (UPI), and Jeff Cunningham, former publisher of Forbes. Admiral Thomas Moorer, the former Chairman of the Joint Chiefs of Staff and Chief of Naval Operations during the Vietnam War, also served as one of the company's founding board members. Former United States Secretary of State and Nixon and Ford administration Chief of Staff General Alexander M. Haig, Jr. served as special adviser to NewsMax.

In 1998, Newsmax became known for its anti-Clinton content. In the fall of 2007, Newsmax CEO Christopher Ruddy published a positive interview with former president Bill Clinton on Newsmax.com, followed by a positive cover story in Newsmax magazine. The New York Times said with reference to the event that politics had made "strange bedfellows." Bill Clinton also visited the Newsmax headquarters in West Palm Beach in 2010. In 2014, Newsmax donated $1 million to the Clinton Foundation and CEO Christopher Ruddy has accompanied President Clinton on foundation trips to Africa.

In a January 2010 profile on the company, the Financial Times reported that the "rise of Newsmax" had defied the media trend and said that the Newsmax website was "one of the strongest conservative voices online". The paper said Newsmax had witnessed 40 percent growth rates per annum over the past decade, closing 2009 with $35 million revenues, up from $25 million the year before. A 2010 New York Post story reported that the paper's long-time former editor Kenneth Chandler was tapped as Newsmax Magazine's editor-in-chief. CEO Ruddy also told the Post the company expected annual 2010 revenues to exceed $50 million.

A profile on Newsmax in The New York Times described the company as a "potent force in conservative politics" and noted the company's headquarters had become a must stop for Republican candidates seeking the party's 2012 nomination.

Starting in April 2013, Newsmax.com and its affiliated sites drew 14.4 million unique visitors, leading comScore's News/Politics category over such sites as The Huffington Post Politics, Fox News Politics, CNN Politics, NBCNews.com Politics, and Politico in monthly viewership for two consecutive months.

In March 2014, Newsmax was profiled in Bloomberg Businessweek by correspondent Karl Taro Greenfeld. The story detailed Newsmax's successful business model of targeting higher-incomed baby boomers. The average age of a Newsmax online reader is 54.7 years of age. The profile detailed Newsmax's plans to launch a linear and Over-the-top (OTT) content cable channel, and suggested their revenue model which sells "a smorgasbord of political, health, and financial information, self-help books, and even vitamin supplements" could make the company uniquely competitive in this arena.

Newsmax contributors include Nancy Brinker, George Will, John Gizzi, Lanny Davis, Alan Dershowitz, Christopher W. Ruddy, David Limbaugh, Ben Stein, Susan Estrich, Dr. Laura Schlessinger, Michael Reagan, Dr. Mehmet Oz and Dr. Michael Roizen.

In November 2017, Politico reported that Fox News, facing new competitors, was giving more favorable coverage to President Donald Trump. In an interview, Newsmax CEO Christopher Ruddy criticized Fox News' hosts unwillingness to criticize President Donald Trump, telling Politico that "Newsmax is very supportive of the president, but we also will publish things that are critical of him time to time," Ruddy said. "Fox seems to have decided to become very closely aligned, which seems unnatural, and it doesn't seem consistent.

Coverage of the 2020 United States presidential election 

During the 2020 United States presidential election, President Trump began to promote Newsmax over its rival, Fox News. Trump's preference for Newsmax over Fox News became clearer after the latter became the first news outlet to call Arizona for Democratic challenger Joe Biden. Newsmax has made their more conservative leanings a selling point to disaffected Fox News viewers, as well as employing Fox News alumni to join their lineup on Newsmax TV, such as Rob Schmitt and Greg Kelly. Emily VanDerWerff of Vox reported that the outlet "spent lots of time arguing that other media outlets jumped the gun in calling the election for Biden and that Trump still has a path to win this thing," and that it was one of the only networks that didn't call the election for Biden, citing the Trump campaign's legal challenges. However, she did write that "Newsmax doesn't go full arch-conservative" and "doesn't give airtime to QAnon paranoiacs."

CNN's Brian Stelter, in an on-air interview, asked Newsmax CEO Christopher Ruddy why the network chose to air "election denialism" and "bogus voter fraud stuff," to which Ruddy replied that the network featured all points of view and argued that all of the other major news outlets who had reported Biden's election win were "rushing".

In an interview with Variety, Ruddy stated that, "We are waiting for the states' certification and the electoral college, but we will at some point when that happens" and insisted: "We will be supportive of whoever the next president is." He added "Newsmax would never become Trump TV. We have always seen ourselves as an independent news agency" but would be willing to Trump having a weekly show. Ruddy says the company is "moderately conservative and we will continue to have a moderately conservative viewpoint on things – including the president."

In a later interview with The New Yorker, Ruddy stated, "I do think that Donald Trump should concede when the certifications come in," he said, adding that he "would not support going to state legislators to overturn the electors."

Following the certification of the electoral college of Joe Biden as the winner on December 14, 2020, the network began using the title, "President-elect" to refer to Biden.

Acquisition reports 
On November 15, 2020, The Wall Street Journal reported that Hicks Equity Partners, a private equity firm with ties to a co-chair of the Republican National Committee, was exploring a buyout of Newsmax. The Hicks group identified a team of executives who would manage the network, and had been talking to former Fox News hosts including Megyn Kelly. Media analyst Michael Nathanson reported that if a competing network took 20% of Fox News' audience, it could sap about $200 million in annual profit from the company. In an interview with Variety, Newsmax CEO Christopher Ruddy stated "we are not actively selling" the company though he had expressions of interests from investors. Regarding Hicks Equity Partners, Ruddy stated, "we have no deal with them." Ruddy stated that "We would like to overtake Fox News in 12 months, and I think it's doable."

Post-2020 United States presidential election 
Newsmax promoted baseless allegations that voting machine company Smartmatic and its competitor Dominion Voting Systems had conspired to rig the election against Trump. In December 2020, Smartmatic sent a letter to Newsmax threatening legal action and demanding "a full and complete retraction of all false and defamatory statements and reports."

Days later, a Newsmax host stated the company "would like to clarify its news coverage and note it has not reported as true certain claims" made by Newsmax interviewees about Dominion and Smartmatic. Newsmax declared that it had "no evidence" of certain claims made on its programming, including the claim that the two companies have a business relationship, the claim that either company used each other's software, and the claim that either company "manipulated votes" in the 2020 American general election. Newsmax also stated it had "no evidence" that Smartmatic software was used anywhere except Los Angeles during the 2020 election. Newsmax additionally said viewers should be aware of "several facts", including that both companies have no relationship with George Soros, and that "Smartmatic is a U.S. company and not owned by the Venezuelan government" or any other foreign entity.

Dominion executive Eric Coomer sued Newsmax, other conservative media outlets, the Trump campaign and others for defamation in December 2020, asserting they falsely alleged he had acted to rig voting machines in association with antifa. In April 2021, Newsmax published a retraction and apology on its website, saying it "found no evidence" to support the allegations against Coomer. In exchange, Coomer dropped Newsmax from his suit.

Mediaite's Rudy Takala wrote that conservatives disgruntled with Fox News could potentially be disappointed by Newsmax due to CEO Christopher Ruddy's friendship with former Democratic President Bill Clinton and positive remarks about a Hillary Clinton presidential campaign. Newsmax has previously donated $1 million to the Clinton Foundation. When reached for comment, Ruddy said, "Like Donald Trump, Rupert Murdoch and other business people, I have donated to the Clinton Foundation and a few Democrats, but over 90 percent of my political contributions have been to Republicans, including ones to President Trump."

Jeffrey McCall, a journalism professor at DePauw University, told Mediaite that "Ruddy is a pragmatist unlikely to allow his operation to be a fully ideological platform. Trump allies who want to bend the arc of media progressivism will need a much more comprehensive national strategy than just trying to take over one particular media outlet."

Adweek reported that Newsmax's TV ratings grew tenfold in the fourth quarter of 2020 compared to the previous quarter. Its top two shows, Spicer & Co. and Greg Kelly Reports (at 7 p.m.), averaged 816,000 total viewers during the same November 7–18 interval. Regarding coverage of the Biden administration, CEO Christopher Ruddy told Adweek "I think Newsmax's job is to be loyal opposition, to question the policies, the programs and the people that are coming into the Biden administration. We're going to take a very careful look at that. I think we were pretty fair with Barack Obama. We were tough on him, but we never called for his impeachment", he said. Newsmax TV momentarily exceeded Fox News in viewership in December 2020, but lost viewers after the conclusion of the election cycle. A Pew Research Center study found that Newsmax's reach (10% of American adults) continued to trail Fox News's reach (43% of American adults) in March 2021.

In July 2021, Vox noted that "Newsmax's effort to out-Trump the competition has been less successful since Trump left the White House for Mar-a-Lago. Newsmax's viewership is down more than 50 percent from January (from an average of about 300,000 viewers then to about 114,000 on July 18), and following a significant slump in December and January, Fox News has reestablished itself as not just the most-watched right-wing cable news network but the most-watched cable news network, period."

In August 2021, Dominion sued Newsmax for "knowingly and continuously" promoting false election fraud narratives. Newsmax said in a statement that it had "simply reported on allegations made by well-known public figures, including the President, his advisors and members of Congress", adding: "Dominion's action today is a clear attempt to squelch such reporting and undermine a free press".

In November 2021, Newsmax White House correspondent Emerald Robinson falsely tweeted that the Moderna COVID-19 vaccine contained luciferase "so that you can be tracked." This echoed earlier false social media claims that the vaccine supposedly had satanic links due to "lucifer" in luciferase and alleged references to "666." Robinson's tweet began with the salutation "Dear Christians" and referred her over 400,000 followers to the Book of Revelation; in a tweet days earlier, she equated vaccines with the Mark of the Beast. Twitter removed the tweet that day and suspended Robinson's account for seven days, citing "repeated violations of our COVID-19 misinformation policy," as Newsmax sought to distance itself from her remark and removed her from the air pending an inquiry. Robinson returned to Twitter after her suspension to continue spreading COVID-19 misinformation, causing Twitter to permanently ban her within hours. Newsmax announced the next month that it would not renew Robinson's contract when it ended in January 2022.

False information about climate change 
In November 2021, a study by the Center for Countering Digital Hate described Newsmax as being among "ten fringe publishers" that together were responsible for nearly 70 percent of Facebook user interactions with content that denied climate change. Facebook disputed the study's methodology.

News integrity issues 
In 2018, the Qatari government sought to acquire a major stake in Newsmax in order to "win friends and clout in the United States as it struggle[s] to respond to a Trump-endorsed blockade by its Arab neighbors."

Media Matters reported that during the COVID-19 pandemic in the United States, Newsmax sent a marketing email to its subscriber list asserting that "the WORST thing you could do is get a vaccine when it becomes available" because "vaccines are one of the biggest health scares of our lifetime—a scam perpetuated among the American people." It instead encouraged subscription to a health newsletter and dietary supplements. When contacted by Newsweek, Newsmax issued a statement saying "This marketing material was inadvertently published and it does not reflect the views of Newsmax." Newsmax has since strongly endorsed the Biden administration's efforts to have Americans get vaccinated.

Reception 

In 2009, editor Michael Massing of the Columbia Journalism Review stated that "Far-right Web sites like World Net Daily and Newsmax.com floated all kinds of specious stories about Obama that quickly careened around the blogosphere and onto talk radio. One particular favorite was the claim that Bill Ayers ghost-wrote Dreams From My Father."

In March 2009, MarketWatch'''s media critic Jon Friedman stated that "Newsmax has flourished because Ruddy has exhibited a stronger commitment to the bottom line than to presenting himself as an ideologue."

In 2010, Nielsen Online said Newsmax was the most trafficked conservative website with approximately 4 million unique visitors monthly. Alexa Internet statistics for Newsmax.com indicate that the readership consists mainly of Internet users over the age of 45, which aligns itself to the average age of Republican leaning voters, as gathered by The Pew Research Center.

Former President Bill Clinton, who described Newsmax's CEO Ruddy as a friend, made headlines when he visited Newsmax's offices during the summer of 2010. When Sarah Palin stopped by the office for an interview, U.S. News & World Report suggested the move was the clearest indication yet she was planning to run for President. According to the magazine, Newsmax is a major player in GOP politics, as seen during the 2012 primaries. Visitors have also included Rep. Michele Bachmann, Gov. Tim Pawlenty, Sen. John Thune, Gov. Haley Barbour, Sen. Mitt Romney, former Florida Gov. Jeb Bush, and former Sen. Rick Santorum, among others.

An April 2010 cover story for Talkers Magazine featured Newsmax as a model of future media companies called "Media Stations" that offer their audience audio, video, digital, and even print content.

In March 2014, Newsmax was profiled in Bloomberg Businessweek by correspondent Karl Taro Greenfeld. The Bloomberg Businessweek story detailed Newsmax's successful business model of targeting higher-incomed Baby boomers. The average age of a Newsmax online reader is 54.7 years of age. The profile detailed Newsmax's plans to launch a linear and over-the-top (OTT) content cable channel, and suggested their revenue model which sells "a smorgasbord of political, health, and financial information, self-help books, and even vitamin supplements" could make the company uniquely competitive in this arena.

In 2017, The Washington Post described the relationship Ruddy, though not a registered Republican, had with President Donald Trump as a significant influence: "...with his dual role as a newsman and a close friend".

In 2019, the Columbia Journalism Review reported, "There are currently about 15 to 20 conservative websites which attract at least one million unique visitors per month. Some are venerable right-wing reliables like National Review, The Washington Times, or Newsmax. Others, like Infowars, The Gateway Pundit, Big League Politics, and Breitbart, mine the far fringes of the right."

 Additional outlets 

Newsmax magazine
Newsmax Media publishes Newsmax magazine, which the company describes as one of the nation's largest independent monthlies "with a conservative perspective." During 2020 the company reported a monthly readership of over 1 million people.

Newsmax TV

In 2014, Newsmax Media announced they would be starting a new television news channel. It was marketed to compete with Fox News Channel. On their website Newsmax said they expected to have up to 21 hours of original programming a day by the end of the summer. Later named as Newsmax TV and launched in June 2014, it was originally available on DirecTV and for free on the Newsmax website.

Newsmax Adria
 was a partnership between Newsmax Media and United Media that began operating in June 2020. The new partnership operated in most of the former Yugoslav countries. It produced a newly retitled daily news bulletins Dnevnik Newsmax Adria on Nova BH in Bosnia and Herzegovina, and evening magazine program Pregled dana'' on Nova S in Serbia. Alongside N1 and Nova S, Newsmax Adria acted as a rival to Telekom Srbija and regularly reported Serbia's government corruption scandals. It ceased production in October 2022.

Notes

External links 

 

American companies established in 1998
American conservative websites
News agencies based in the United States
Publishing companies established in 1998
Climate change denial
Conservative media in the United States
Conspiracist media